The Russian Maritime Register of Shipping (RS) maintains a ship register of the Russian Federation, based in Saint Petersburg, and is a marine classification society. Its activities aim to enhance safety of navigation, safety of life at sea, security of ships, safe carriage of cargo, environmental safety of ships, prevention of pollution from ships, and performance of authorisations issued by maritime administrations and customers.

RS develops and continually improves its rules and guidelines in compliance with requirements of the international standards to ensure the safety at sea and pollution prevention. The RS seeks to maintain its own quality management system at the highest possible level and also to promote implementation of high technical standards in design of ships, shipbuilding and shipping industry using its unique experience in ensuring maritime safety.

RS has over 100 offices worldwide providing classification, survey, certification, design appraisal and quality systems' verification services. RS was one of the twelve classification societies who are members of the International Association of Classification Societies (IACS), which cover 90% of the world merchant fleet. Due to the 2022 Russian invasion of Ukraine, IACS withdrew RS's  membership on March 11, 2022. RS takes part in the work of the International Maritime Organization, the International Organization for Standardization and the International Labour Organization.

History
In Russia the first acts of state technical supervision date back to the beginning of the 18th century - the time of the intensive development of the Russian fleet. By the end of the century the Charter of Merchant Shipping had been approved regulating mandatory state registration of ships and documentation on the technical condition of a vessel. At that time, ships were classed by type and age, therefore there emerged a necessity in a more advanced system that would take into account structural features, strength, technical condition and navigation area.

As soon as the end of the 19th century the first classification body was established. In 1899 the first classification rules emerged. On 31 December 1913, the charter of the classification society "Russian Register" was approved. The society was renamed several times due to the historical reasons: Russian Register, the USSR Register of Shipping, Russian Maritime Register of Shipping.

The proper technical condition of the fleet is to be provided by highly qualified staff and regular scientific research. Since 1914 the research and development activities have been coordinated by the Scientific and Technical Council. RS has always been using the latest scientific and technical achievements. The USSR Register of Shipping was the first society to develop requirements for Arctic ships. The society's rules for electric welding proved the possibility of implementation of this new technology during the construction and repair of ships. Since the 1950s the USSR Register of Shipping has become the only classification society in the world to have nuclear ships in its class.

Russian Maritime Register of Shipping is the legal successor of the USSR Register of Shipping.

Organization and management
Russian Maritime Register of Shipping (RS) is an international classification society established in 1913.

In RS class there are 6 677 ships flying flags of more than 40 states. RS structure comprises the Head Office in St. Petersburg and 109 offices in Russia and abroad. Over 1500 highly qualified specialists provide the whole range of RS works and services worldwide,

As members of the RF delegations, the RS experts participate in the proceedings of the IMO, ISO and EFQM committees and sub-committees. RS is an associate member of INTERTANKO, INTERCARGO and BIMCO.

RS performs classification and survey of ships and floating structures under construction and in service as well as statutory surveys as authorized by maritime administrations of a number of countries.

Authorized by the maritime administration of the RF and other 37 countries, RS performs certification of safety management systems of shipping companies and ships for compliance with ISM Code. This safety standard provides for establishing safety management systems in shipping companies and for eliminating human factor from safe operation of ships. RS experts on ISM Code working in RS offices worldwide provide prompt services on certification for compliance with the ISM Code requirements.

Main objectives
 providing safety of life at sea;
 providing safe navigation of ships;
 safe carriage of goods by sea and in inland waters;
 promoting environmental protection.

See also 
 Classification Society
 International Association of Classification Societies
 International Maritime Organization

References

External links
 Russian Maritime Register of Shipping website
 IACS - International Association of Classification Societies

Ship classification societies